Edward Benjamin Kwesi Ampah Jnr also known by the name Eddie Ampah was a Ghanaian author and politician. He was the member of parliament for the Asebu constituency from 1965 to 1966.

Early life and education
Ampah was born on 6 March 1925 at Saltpond in the Central Region. He had his secondary education at the Accra Academy from 1941 to 1945.

Politics
Ampah was elected chairman of the Cape Coast Municipal Council in 1954. He remained in this position until 1958. In 1956 he was one of the candidates nominated by the Convention People's Party to represent the Cape Coast electoral area for the 1956 Legislative Assembly elections however, Nathaniel Azarco Welbeck was ultimately selected to contest for the seat. On 1 July 1959 he was appointed district commissioner for Cape Coast and the regional secretary of the Convention People's Party in the Central Region. In 1965 he became the member of parliament for the Asebu constituency. He served in this capacity until 1966 when the Nkrumah government was overthrown.

Death
He died in the late 1960s.

Publications
 The tears of Dr. Kwame Nkrumah: the Rise of the Convention People's party (1951)
 The Gold Coast Tomorrow (1955)
 Osagyefo in the Central Region (1960)

See also
 List of MPs elected in the 1965 Ghanaian parliamentary election

References

1925 births
1960s deaths
Ghanaian MPs 1965–1966
Convention People's Party (Ghana) politicians
20th-century Ghanaian politicians
Alumni of the Accra Academy